These are lists of schools in Shenzhen.

By district
 List of schools in Bao'an District
 List of schools in Futian District
 List of schools in Guangming District
 List of schools in Longgang District, Shenzhen (does not include schools in Dapeng New District)
 List of schools in Longhua District, Shenzhen
 List of schools in Luohu District
 List of schools in Nanshan District, Shenzhen
 List of schools in Pingshan District, Shenzhen
 List of schools in Yantian District

Dapeng New District schools are listed in that article.

By type

List of municipal schools
 (深圳大学师范学院附属中学) - Affiliated with Shenzhen University
The First Vocational Technical School of Shenzhen (深圳市第一职业技术学校)
  (深圳市第二实验学校)
 Shenzhen No. 2 Vocational School of Technology (深圳市第二职业技术学校)
 (深圳市第三高级中学)
 Shenzhen No. 7 Senior High School (深圳市第七高级中学)
 (深圳艺术学校)
Shenzhen Experimental School
Shenzhen Foreign Languages School
  (深圳技师学院)
Shenzhen Middle School
Shenzhen Pengcheng Technical College (深圳鹏城技师学院), previously Shenzhen Second Senior Technical School (深圳市技工学校)
  (深圳科学高中)
 Shenzhen Primary School (深圳小学)
 Shenzhen Second Foreign Languages School (深圳第二外国语学校)
 (深圳市第二高级中学)
Shenzhen Senior High School
 Shenzhen Sports School (深圳体育运动学校)
 Shenzhen Yuanping Special Education School (深圳元平特殊教育学校)
 Shenzhen Yuxin School (深圳市育新学校), previously known as the Shenzhen Work-Study School

List of district-operated schools
Please consult the "By district" section above and select the relevant district.

List of international schools
International schools in the city designated as for children of foreign workers include:
Shenzhen American International School
Shekou International School
Shenzhen Japanese School
QSI International School of Shenzhen
International School of Nanshan Shenzhen
Korean International School in Shenzhen
BASIS International School Shenzhen
Bromsgrove-Mission Hills International School of Shenzhen
The Guangdong provincial government approved BASIS and Bromsgrove-Mission Hills while the Shenzhen municipal government approved the other six.

Other international schools:
C-UK College Shenzhen
Green Oasis School
Shenzhen Academy of International Education
Shenzhen College of International Education
Shen Wai International School
Vanke Meisha Academy

See also
 
 
 Education in Shenzhen

References

 
 
 
Schools